James Lewis "Pine" Johnson (October 14, 1915 – February 26, 1990), was an American Quarter Horse trainer best known for training cutting horses Poco Bueno, Poco Lena and Jesse James.

Background
Pine Johnson was born to Una Culbert and William Welborn Johnson near the city, of Seymour, Texas.

In 1945, Johnson started working for E. Paul Waggoner at his 3D Stock Farm in Arlington, Texas.

References

1915 births
1990 deaths
American Quarter Horse trainers
People from Baylor County, Texas